Koppers is a surname. Notable people with it include:

Dico Koppers (born 1992), Dutch footballer
Heinrich Koppers (1872–1941), German engineer. Founder of the chemicals manufacturer Koppers Company in Chicago, Illinois (later moved to Pittsburgh, Pennsylvania), United States.
Wilhelm Koppers (1886–1961), Austrian Catholic priest and anthropologist

See also
Kopper (disambiguation)